Angélique de Saint-Jean Arnauld d'Andilly (28 November 1624 – 29 January 1684) was a French Jansenist nun. Niece of Angélique Arnauld, daughter of Robert Arnauld d'Andilly, and sister of Antoine Arnauld and Simon Arnauld, Angélique de Saint-Jean Arnauld d'Andilly was from the Jansenist Arnauld family.

Life
She entered the  Port-Royal-des-Champs in 1641 and taken her vows on 25 January 1644. Becoming sub-prior in 1653, she and her four sisters heavily opposed the formulary. Arrested in August 1664, she was held at the convent of the Annonciades until 1665. Refused the sacraments until the Clementine peace in 1669, she was made abbess in 1678.

Works

Angélique de Saint-Jean Arnauld d'Andilly published an account of her captivity (1711), the Conférences, the Réflexions, the Relations and was a collaborator on the Nécrologe de l'Abbaye de Notre-Dame de Port-Royal des Champs, Ordre de Cîteaux, Institut du Saint Sacrement ; qui contient les éloges historiques avec les épitaphes des fondateurs & bienfaiteurs de ce monastère, & des autres personnes de distinction (1723).

 Aux portes des ténèbres : Relation de captivité, Préf. Sébastien Lapaque ; notes de Louis Cognet, Paris, Table ronde, 2005 
 Relation de la captivité de la mère Angélique de Saint Jean, religieuse de Port-Royal des Champs, Paris, Gallimard, 1954
 Mémoires pour servir à l'histoire de Port Royal ; et à la vie de la Révérende Mère Marie Angélique de Sainte Magdeleine Arnauld, Réformatrice de ce Monastère, Utrecht, [s.n.], 1742
 Lettres de la mère Angélique de S. Jean à Mr. Arnaud, écrites depuis que la communauté fut transférée à Port-Royal des Champs jusqu'à la paix de l'Église, [S.l.s.n], 1600–1699
 Conférences de la mère Angélique de Saint Jean, abbesse, sur les constitutions du monastère, 1665

See also

Notes

References
 
 Thomas M. Carr Jr., « Grieving Family and Community Ties at Port-Royal : Les Miséricordes of Angélique de Saint-Jean », in La Rochefoucauld ; Mithridate ; Frères et sœurs ; Les Muses sœurs, Éd. et intro. Claire Carlin, Tübingen, Narr, 1998, pp. 171–79
  Thomas M. Carr Jr., Voix des abbesses du Grand Siècle : La Prédication au féminin à Port-Royal : Contexte rhétorique et Dossier, Tübingen, Narr, 2006 
  Michèle Bretz, « Le Combat des moniales de Port-Royal ou la primauté des droits de la conscience: Leurs Relations de captivité : Prolégomènes à leur étude », Romanische Forschungen, 2005; 117 (2), pp. 165–86
  J. Millot, « Anne d'Autriche ou Arnauld d'Andilly ? », Bulletin du Bibliophile et du Bibliothécaire, 1957; 1, pp. 11–16
  Jean Orcibal, Port-Royal entre le miracle et l'obéissance ; Flavie Passart et Angélique de St.-Jean Arnauld d'Andilly, Paris, Desclée De Brouwer 1957
  Reynès Monlaur, Grandes abbesses et moniales : correspondantes de Bossuet, Marseille, Publiroc, 1928
  La Mère Angélique de Saint-Jean, Paris, Bibliothèque Mazarine, 1986

1624 births
1684 deaths
17th-century French nuns
Cistercian nuns
Jansenists
French Roman Catholic abbesses